Miejsce Piastowe  is a village in Krosno County, Subcarpathian Voivodeship, in south-eastern Poland. It is the seat of the gmina (administrative district) called Gmina Miejsce Piastowe.

References

Villages in Krosno County